The 56th Annual TV Week Logie Awards was held on Sunday 27 April 2014 at the Crown Palladium in Melbourne, and broadcast on the Nine Network. The red carpet arrivals was hosted by Sonia Kruger and Jules Lund.

Public voting for the Most Popular categories were conducted through an online survey from 3 February 2014 to 2 March 2014. Nominations were announced on 31 March 2014. Offspring received the most nominations with eight, followed by Home and Away with six. The Block, Hamish & Andy's Gap Year Asia, Paper Giants: Magazine Wars and Redfern Now each received four nominations.

Background

Changes to categories
In January 2014, it was revealed that TV Week had eliminated some categories in a bid to shorten the ceremony. The categories for Most Popular New Male Talent and Most Popular New Female Talent were merged into the Most Popular New Talent category to become gender non-specific. The Most Popular Factual Program category was also eliminated and the Most Outstanding New Talent category was renamed Most Outstanding Newcomer.

Nominations announcements
Nominations were announced in two stages on 31 March 2014; the peer-voted Most Outstanding categories were published in the issue of TV Week that hit newsstands in the morning, while the Most Popular categories were announced in the afternoon at the nominations event in Melbourne, which was hosted by Julia Morris and Chris Brown and attended by network stars.

Winners and nominees
In the tables below, winners are listed first and highlighted in bold.

Gold Logie

Acting/Presenting

Most Popular Programs

Most Outstanding Programs

Performers
Jason Derulo – "Trumpets" / "In My Head" / "The Other Side" / "Talk Dirty"
Ed Sheeran – "Sing"
Kylie Minogue – "I Was Gonna Cancel"
John Newman – "Love Me Again"
Tina Arena – "Only Lonely" (In Memoriam tribute)
MKTO – "Thank You"

Presenters
Hamish Blake and Andy Lee
Julia Morris
Lincoln Lewis
Dave Hughes
Noni Hazlehurst
Lisa Wilkinson
Craig McLachlan
Luke Jacobz
Darren McMullen
Shane Jacobson
Jessica Marais
Samantha Armytage
Gyton Grantley
Tina Arena
Emma Alberici
Jennifer Hawkins
Patrick Brammall
Amanda Keller
Eddie McGuire
Richard Wilkins
Kylie Minogue – Gold Logie for Most Popular Personality on Australian Television

Most nominations
 By network
ABC – 30
Nine Network – 24
Seven Network – 19
Network Ten – 16
SBS – 10
Foxtel – 7
Source:

 By program
 Offspring (Network Ten) – 8
 Home and Away (Seven Network) – 6
 The Block (Nine Network) / Hamish & Andy's Gap Year Asia (Nine Network) / Paper Giants: Magazine Wars (ABC1) / Redfern Now (ABC1) – 4
 A Place to Call Home (Seven Network) / Better Man (SBS One) / Ja'mie: Private School Girl (ABC1) / Miss Fisher's Murder Mysteries (ABC1) / The Project (Network Ten) / Wentworth (SoHo) – 3
Source:

In Memoriam
The In Memoriam segment was introduced by Noni Hazlehurst. Tina Arena performed a cover version of Bon Jovi's "Only Lonely". The following deceased were honoured:

 Wendy Hughes, actress
 Bill Peach AM, presenter
 Anthony Hawkins, actor
 Alan Coleman, executive producer
 Jonathan Dawson, writer, director
 Billy Raymond, entertainer
 Steve Millichamp, actor
 Mia Tolhurst, scriptwriter
 Nick Eade, producer
 Elke Neidhardt AM, actress
 Johnny Lockwood, actor
 Penne Hackforth-Jones, actress
 Barbara Callcott, actress
 Peter Benardos, actress
 Everett De Roche, writer
 Ian Law, executive
 Graeme McNamara, stage manager
 Don Smith, OB manager
 Russ Sefton, executive
 George Burnham, cameraman
 Doug Murray, presenter
 Bob Moore, presenter
 Don Reid, actor
 Joyce Jacobs, actress
 Maureen Duval, presenter
 Brian Moll, actor
 Julian Jover, producer
 Bob Henderson, cameraman
 Ken Chown, producer
 Andrew Plain, sound designer
 Ian Frykberg, executive
 Allan Kendall, producer
 James Condon, actor
 Roy Higgins MBE, presenter
 Charlotte Dawson, presenter

See also
Logie Awards

References

External links

2014
2014 television awards
2014 in Australian television
2014 awards in Australia